Acanthopsilus is a genus of wasps belonging to the family Diapriidae.

Species:

Acanthopsilus marshalli 
Acanthopsilus zangherii

References

Diapriidae
Hymenoptera genera